Malgana is the Aboriginal Australian language of the Malgana people. It is one of the Kartu languages of the Pama–Nyungan family of languages. 

Malgana country is the area around Shark Bay in Western Australia. In particular it includes the Peron and Edel Land Peninsulas as well as some of the adjoining land. The Irra Wangga Language Centre (having taken over from the Yamaji Language Centre) has been carrying out work on the Malgana language since 1995 and has produced an illustrated wordlist as well as grammatical materials and a dictionary (the latter two unpublished).

'Buluguda', 'Damala', and 'Watjanti' were likely Malgana-speaking locations or social groupings, rather than dialects.

Phonology

Consonants

Vowels

References

Gargett, Andrew. (2011). A salvage grammar of Malgana, the language of Shark Bay, Western Australia. (Pacific Linguistics, 624.) Canberra: Research School of Pacific and Asian Studies, Australian National University.

Kartu languages
Extinct languages of Western Australia
Shark Bay